Richard Jonathan Fleeshman (born 8 June 1989) is an English actor and singer. His television career began as a 12-year-old, playing Craig Harris for four years in Coronation Street before going on to become an established television, West End and Broadway performer.

Early and personal life
Fleeshman was born on 8 June 1989 in Manchester. He is the son of former Brookside and Coronation Street actress Sue Jenkins and actor/director David Fleeshman.  He attended Cheadle Hulme School in Cheshire and Wilmslow High School sixth form. He has two sisters, Emily Fleeshman and Rosie Fleeshman who are also actresses. His father was born in Glasgow, Scotland, to a Jewish family.

In 2019, Fleeshman announced via his Instagram account that he is now a vegetarian and had been meat-free for over two years at that point, having "never felt better ethically or physically".

Acting career
Fleeshman began his professional career in the film called An Angel for May. At the age of 12, from 2002 to 2006, he played the role of Craig Harris in Coronation Street. He was the only member of his on-screen family to escape the axe in 2005, leaving the programme at the age of 16. His final episode was broadcast on 16 October 2006. Fleeshman later filmed an episode of Blue Murder in 2007 in which he played the character Ben Holroyd, starring alongside Jill Halfpenny. The episode, called "Crisis Management", was broadcast in December 2007 on ITV. He played the role of Gillen in the ITV comedy drama Monday Monday, which aired on 10 August 2009.

On 16 June 2010, Fleeshman joined the company of Legally Blonde in London, taking over from Duncan James in the role of Warner. In 2009, he played the role of a musically talented autistic boy named Kyle Caddick in a six-part BBC drama series All the Small Things allowing him to act as well as sing. Within the series he performed many songs, both solo and as part of a choir, and also sang the song that runs over the end credits. He co-wrote the song with Sir Elton John and the show's creator Debbie Horsfield. His father, actor David Fleeshman, played the role of Gilbert in the same series. All the Small Things was screened in Australia under the title of Heart and Soul.

Fleeshman starred in the West End production of Ghost: The Musical, based on the film Ghost, written by Bruce Joel Rubin, with music and lyrics by Dave Stewart and Glen Ballard). He played the lead role of Sam Wheat (played by Patrick Swayze in the film) alongside Caissie Levy as Molly and Sharon D. Clarke as Oda Mae Brown. The show premiered at the Opera House, Manchester on 28 March 2011 and moved to the Piccadilly Theatre on 22 June 2011. When Fleeshman was offered the role in its Broadway transfer, he left the show in the West End with co star Caissie Levy on 12 January 2012 to star in the Broadway production. It began previews on 15 March 2012 at the Lunt Fontanne Theater and officially opened on 23 April 2012. Richard was invited to perform at the 2012 Tony Awards. Fleeshman and Levy remained in the Broadway Production until its final performance on 18 August 2012.

In 2013, Fleeshman starred as Bobby Strong in the UK premiere of the hit satirical musical, Urinetown, directed by Jamie Lloyd, at the St James Theatre. He then went on to film Call the Midwife for the BBC which was broadcast early February 2015. His next musical project was playing the role of George Bevan, in A Damsel in Distress, a musical adaption of the novel A Damsel in Distress, at the Chichester Festival Theatre beginning on 30 May 2015.

In 2017, Fleeshman played Francis Drake in two episodes of the CW series Reign.

In 2018, Fleeshman took on the role of Gideon Fletcher in Sting's musical The Last Ship. He received rave reviews for his performance.

In 2018, Fleeshman took on the role of Air-Steward 'Andy' in the West-End gender swapped revival of Stephen Sondheim's Company, directed by Marianne Elliot. For this role, he was nominated for the Laurence Olivier Award for Best Actor in a Supporting Role in a Musical.
In 2022, Richard guest starred in CHIVALRY for Channel 4 and played the role of KEN in The Sandman. ( Netflix)
In 2023, he had a leading role in the TV series The Ark on Syfy.
Richard is playing Walter in the Uk premiere Marjorie Prime at The Menier Theatre in London.

Music career

Fleeshman is a singer, songwriter and in 2003 he was the youngest celebrity contestant to win a Stars in Their Eyes celebrity special (at 13). He also won Soapstar Superstar in 2006 and won £200,000 for his chosen charity, The Kirsty Appeal.

Richard also plays the piano and guitar. On 22 April 2007, he performed on the ITV1 show An Audience with Coronation Street.

Fleeshman signed a major record deal with Universal Records in 2007 and then completed writing his debut album.

In 2008, Richard supported Elton John to join him on his Summer stadium tour. Later that year, he supported him again on part of his Red Piano Tour. He supported him again on his summer European Tour in June.

Filmography

Studio albums

EPs

Singles

References

General
Richard Fleeshman – from Bramhall to Broadway Cheshire Life. June 2012.

External links

 
 

1989 births
Living people
20th-century English male actors
21st-century English male actors
English male child actors
English male film actors
English male musical theatre actors
English male singer-songwriters
English male soap opera actors
English male stage actors
English male television actors
People educated at Cheadle Hulme School
Singing talent show winners